Federated Tower is a 358 ft (109 m) tall skyscraper in Pittsburgh, Pennsylvania. The building is part of Liberty Center, a two building complex which also includes the Westin Convention Center Hotel. It was completed in 1986 and has 27 floors and 530,000 square feet of space. It is the 16th tallest building in the city and houses the corporate headquarters of Federated Hermes.

Liberty Center was developed and built by Liberty Center Ventures, a partnership of Forest City Enterprises and Jos. L. Muscarelle, Inc. and opened in December 1986. The $137 million mixed-use complex was the first major development following the Renaissance II burst of construction in downtown Pittsburgh. The entire Liberty Center complex opened in December 1986. The complex was financed from three sources: a $99 million loan from Metropolitan Life Insurance Company, a $21 million from the Pittsburgh Urban Redevelopment Authority, and the remainder from Jos. L. Muscarelle, Inc. and Forest City Enterprises.

In August 2013 the tower was sold by Forest City to Starwood Capital Group for $135 million.

On February 18, 2014 the tower opened the newly relocated downtown Post Office on the lobby floor.

In January 2017, CBRE Global Investors purchased the Federated Tower for an estimated $98 million. The purchase did not include the adjacent Westin Convention Center Hotel, which was part of the 2013 by Starwood Capital Group.

See also
List of tallest buildings in Pittsburgh

References

Emporis
Skyscraperpage

Skyscraper office buildings in Pittsburgh
Headquarters in the United States
Financial services company headquarters in the United States
1982 establishments in Pennsylvania